Amy B. Arata is an American politician serving as a member of the Maine House of Representatives from the 65th district. She assumed office on December 5, 2018.

Early life and education 
Arata was born in Winslow, Maine and attended Lawrence High School. She earned a Bachelor of Science degree in biology from Gordon College and a Master of Science in genetics from the University of California, Davis.

Career 
From 2007 to 2009, Arata worked as a real estate agent for Keller Williams Realty Mid Maine. Since 2012, she has been a broker for the Bean Group. She was also a member of the Maine Board of Education. Arata was elected to the Maine House of Representatives in November 2018 and assumed office in December 2018.

In January 2019, Arata sponsored a bill that would revise a state law governing the dissemination of obscene materials to minors. Arata later stated that she was inspired to sponsor the bill after her teenage son was assigned to read Kafka on the Shore.

Personal life 
Arata and her husband, Michael, have three children and live in New Gloucester, Maine. Arata's father, Richard Bradstreet, is also a member of the Maine House of Representatives.

References 

Living people
Republican Party members of the Maine House of Representatives
Women state legislators in Maine
People from Winslow, Maine
People from New Gloucester, Maine
Gordon College (Massachusetts) alumni
University of California, Davis alumni
Year of birth missing (living people)